Nycteropa subovalis is a moth of the family Oenosandridae and only member of the genus Nycteropa.

The wingspan is about 40 mm. The wings are grey. The forewings are darker and have a number of submarginal dark sinuous parallel lines.

External links
Australian moths

Oenosandridae
Moths of Australia
Monotypic moth genera
Moths described in 1941